Rambukkana, Pradeshiya Sabha, lies within the Kegalle district in Sabaragamuwa Province, Sri Lanka. The Council was incorporated on 7 July 1991 as Rambukkana ward and a few small towns. The constituency today has an area of 128.8 square km, with a population of 84,260.

Praposed interchange of expressway of Rambukkana was designed to construct.

The first President of the Council, P. T. Karunaratne, was chosen by the Cabinet.

The incline of Sri Lanka's railway Main Line starts at Rambukkana railway station, which has the second longest railway platform in the country.

Villages 
Naranbedda

See also 
 Rambukkana Divisional Secretariat

References 

Electoral districts of Sri Lanka
Populated places in Kegalle District